Ale Bagu is a stratovolcano located in the Afar Region, Ethiopia. It is the highest volcano of Erta Ale Range. The village of El Dom sits at the base of Ale Bagu.

See also
Afar Depression
Geography of Ethiopia
List of volcanoes in Ethiopia

References 

Mountains of Ethiopia
Stratovolcanoes of Ethiopia
Afar Region